USS Spirea was a 409-ton steamer acquired by the Union Navy  towards the end of the American Civil War.

The Union Navy placed Spirea, with a crew of 65 sailors and naval officers, in service as a gunship and assigned her to blockade operations against the Confederate States of America, placing her as a gunboat on the Gulf of Mexico coast of Florida where she spent her entire U.S. Navy career.

Built in Fair Haven, Connecticut, in 1864 

Spirea—a twin-screw steamer built in 1864 at Fair Haven, Connecticut, and sister ship of USS Hibiscus (1864)—was purchased by the Union Navy at New York City on 30 December 1864 from S. M. Pook; and was commissioned on 9 January 1865, Acting Volunteer Lieutenant George E. Nelson in command.

Civil War operations 

Spirea was ordered to join the East Gulf Blockading Squadron at Key West, Florida, in early January 1865. On 23 February, she led an expedition up the St. Marks River to land Union Army troops for an attack on Tallahassee, Florida.

Spirea and two other ships ran aground, but she was refloated and patrolled off St. Marks, Florida, until 1 May when she joined the blockade off Apalachicola, Florida. Two weeks later, she returned to St. Marks.

Post-war deactivation 

After the end of the Civil War, Spirea remained on duty in the Gulf of Mexico until she sailed early in August. Spirea was decommissioned at the New York Navy Yard on 23 August 1865 and was sold at public auction at New York City on 5 October 1866.

Subsequent maritime career 

The screw steamer was documented as Sappho on 30 January 1867 for operation out of New York City. She was apparently lost later in 1867, but details of her demise have not been found.

References  

Ships of the Union Navy
Ships built in Connecticut
Steamships of the United States Navy
Gunboats of the United States Navy
American Civil War patrol vessels of the United States
1864 ships